Crawford may refer to:

Places

Canada
 Crawford Bay Airport, British Columbia
 Crawford Lake Conservation Area, Ontario

United Kingdom
 Crawford, Lancashire, a small village near Rainford, Merseyside, England
 Crawford, South Lanarkshire, a village in Scotland
 Crawford Castle, a medieval fortification
 Crawford Castle, an iron-age fortification, at Spetisbury, Dorset, England

United States
 Crawford, Alabama (disambiguation), several places
 Crawford, Colorado
 Crawford, Florida
 Crawford, Georgia
 Crawford, Maine
 Crawford, Mississippi
 Crawford, Missouri
 Crawford, Nebraska
 Crawford, New York
 Crawford, Ohio
 Crawford, Oklahoma
 Crawford, Texas 
 Crawford Notch, a mountain pass in New Hampshire
 Crawford County (disambiguation), several counties
 Crawford Township (disambiguation), several townships

Elsewhere
 Crawford crater, Australia
 Crawford, Cape Town, a suburb of Cape Town, South Africa
 Crawford, Tiruchirappalli, a suburb in Tiruchirappalli, India
 Mount Crawford (South Australia), a location in Australia
 Crawford Market, a place in India

Arts and entertainment
 Crawford (film), a documentary film about Crawford, Texas
 Crawford (TV series), a television comedy series, on CBC Television, where one of the characters has the ability to speak to raccoons
 Crawford or Crawford & Morgan, a short-lived syndicated comic strip (1977–1978) by Chuck Jones

Organisations
 Crawford & Company, a major insurance claims management company
 Crawford and Son, a defunct South Australian grocery business 
 Crawford Auto-Aviation Museum, part of the Western Reserve Historical Society, Cleveland, Ohio, US
 William Crawford & Sons, former British biscuit company
 Crawford Composites, American manufacturer of carbon fiber and composite parts

People
 Crawford (name), given name and surname, includes a list of people with the name
 Clan Crawford, Scottish clan

Other uses
 Crawford Hall (University of Pittsburgh), an academic building on the campus of the University of Pittsburgh
 Crawford Purchase, 1783 treaty that enabled Loyalist settlement in what is now part of eastern Ontario, Canada
 Crawford School of Public Policy at the Australian National University, Canberra 
 Crawford v. Washington, a U.S. Supreme Court case regarding the Sixth Amendment to the U.S. Constitution
 Crawford v. Marion County Election Bd., a U.S. Supreme Court case regarding voter-ID laws
 Hasely Crawford Stadium, national stadium of Trinidad and Tobago
 Pittsburgh Crawfords, a Negro league baseball team

See also
 Crawfordjohn, South Lanarkshire, Scotland, a village
 Crawfordsburn, County Down, Northern Ireland, a village
 Crawfordville (disambiguation)
 Crawfordsville (disambiguation)
 Justice Crawford (disambiguation)
 Mount Crawford (disambiguation)